Coleophora turolella is a moth of the family Coleophoridae. It is found in Spain.

The larvae feed on Carex brizoides.

References

turolella
Moths of Europe
Moths described in 1927